Jefferson Vieira da Cruz (born July 3, 1981) is a Brazilian football player. He was active from 1999 to 2009, and retired on January 1, 2010.

Club statistics

References

External links

1981 births
Living people
Brazilian footballers
Brazilian expatriate footballers
J2 League players
CR Flamengo footballers
Bangu Atlético Clube players
Sagan Tosu players
Yokohama FC players
Fagiano Okayama players
Expatriate footballers in Japan
Association football forwards